Qazi Muhammad Yousaf (1 September 1883 – 4 January 1963) was a companion of Mirza Ghulam Ahmad. He was regional head Amir of North West Frontier chapter of the Ahmadiyya Community.

Early life
Qazi Muhammad Yousaf was born September 1, 1883, at Hoti, Maradan.  The family shifted to Peshawar in 1884. His father, Qazi Muhammad Siddique, was a religious scholar and occasional imam at the Mosque in Gul Badhsh Ji Street, Peshawar. In 1896, at age 12, Muhammad Yousaf was admitted to Mission High School Peshawar  He later studied at Islamia High School, completing  his Secondary School Certificate Examination.

Introduction to Ahmadiyya
In 1901, he came across books by Mirza Ghulam Ahmad, namely ‘Shuhna e Haq’ and ‘Izala e Auhaam’

Conversion and  Bay'ah (Ahmadiyya)
On January 15, 1902, Qazi Muhammad Yousaf converted to Ahmadiyya Islam due to the efforts of his English teacher Munshi Khadim Hussain  
He attended the Annual Ahmadiyya Convention in December 1902 and physically took the Bay'ah (Ahmadiyya) at the hands of Mirza Ghulam Ahmad. In Qadian, he also had the opportunity to meet Sahibzada Abdul Latif

A dream of Khalifa Hakeem Noor-ud-Din
On May 28, 1908, he participated in the funeral prayers of Mirza Ghulam Ahmad and took his fresh Oath of Allegiance (  Bay'ah (Ahmadiyya)  ) at the hands of the newly elected Khalifa Hakeem Noor-ud-Din.
In 1912, Yousaf met  Khalifa Hakeem Noor-ud-Din and presented his book Iblagh e Haq to him,  giving him a written request for prayers. On the same letter, the Khalifa wrote, he would pray for him. He also wrote a ‘Ro’ya’ (dream) of his own upon the same letter. He wrote: “Insha Allah I shall pray for you. You must also persist in prayers. I saw Hadhrat Umar in a Ro’ya (dream). He  was saying, ‘Iran is destroyed’. They [Iranis] abuse me,  ( Tabarra ) l but I don’t care,  I am now preparing armies. May Allah make you a commander of that army.”

The Split and Re-patriation

On March 14, 1914, Khalifa Hakeem Noor-ud-Din died. The Community was split into two. Muhammad Yousaf sided with the group headed by Muhammad Ali of the Ahmadiyya Anjuman Ishaat-i-Islam Lahore.

Personal life
He has listed 113 persons who converted to Ahmadiyya Islam due to his efforts. He  died on January 4, 1963, and was buried at Mardan.

List of his Works 

He wrote regularly for the monthly Review of Religions, (Urdu) 1919-1921. the Al-Hakam, the Badar, the Al-Fazal, the Farooq . Here is a list of his Works below.

Bibliography 

Wafat al masih nasiri (pages 52)
Asaar e qiamat (pages 32)
Nazool al masih (pages 142) (1912)
Aqaid e Ahmadiyya (pages 72) (1912)
Khurooj e dabatul al arz (pages 12) (1911)
Khurooj e dajjal (pages 80) (1912)
Tuhfa tun nubuwah (pages 80) (1912)
Khurooj e yajooj majooj ( pages 80) (1912)
Zameema tuha tun nabuwah (pages 52)
Iblagh e haq-collected . 11. Al Islam (pages 80) (1912)
Attab leegh no-1 (1913)
Pashto poem (Pages 8)
Dalayal qaraniya bar wafat Isa nasiri (pages 16)
Attab leegh no-3
Dalaya wafat isa nasiri az salaf saliheen (pages 24) (1913)
Tardeed dalayal hayat hazrat isa nasir (pages 26) (1913)
Haqeeqa tul mahdi (pages 432) (1913)
Tazkira tun nabi (pages 240)
Durre adan pushto (pages 96)
Haqeeqa tu Yasuu
Al nubuwwah fil quran
Haqeeqa tul Masih
Al-mauood fil Quran (pages 56)
Tafseer khatam unnabiyyeen (Page 34)
Muta'a nabi
Mutalibaat burhaniyya (Pages 28)
Azaab aur rasool (Pages 12)
Al tableegh no-1 (Pages 80)
Pashto Lughat  (Unpublished)
Tafseer al Quraan (4 vol) (Unpublished)
Pashto divan ahmadi (Pages 408)
Ah Nadir Shah su sho
Ahmadiyyat aur Afghanistan
Ahsanal Hadith
Tareekh bani Israel  (unpublished)
Pushto zarbul amsaal
Pushto Qawaid
Afghanistan au Ahmadiyyat
Pashto ka Qaida
Wurmbay Kitaab
Dwayam kitaab
Durre Adan Farsi
Ahmad  Mauood
Insaan e kamil
Ayat khatam an nabiyyeen wa tafseer salf saliheen
Wafaat hazarat Isa Nasiri
Aqaid Ahmadiyya
Khitaab ba bani Israel  (Unpublished)
Fazeelat syedna hazrat Muhammad saw bar jamee anbiya
Aqaid Ahmadiyya Farsi manzoom
Al Nubuwat fil Quran  (Pages 432)
Al nubuwat fil wahi wal ilhaam
Al nubuwat fil Ahadeeth
Challenge inaami yak sad rupya darbara nubuwat
Durre adan nazam Urdu
Kitaab al hayat
Mulvi Muhammad Ali ka maujooda mazhab- khilaf Ahmad aakhir zaman
Imtiaz
Ahmad jari ullah
Ahmad mudday Nubuwat
Ahmad madaar-e-nijaat
Ismu-hu-Ahnad
Ahmad ke dawe  ki  bunyaat
Tazkira tul hasan
Aik ghalat fahmi ka izala (Pages 32)
Anajeel ka yusu aur Quran ka Isa
Sianat –u-swalihhen
Ahmad ki pakeeza zindagi
Hazrat Muhammad saw ki taleemat e muqadisa
Muje mera mazhab kion piara he
Wafaat hazrat isa nasiri (Urdu)
Tanqeed bar ishtihaar yome dua
Ane wala masih aa gia
Do darjan challenge
Syedna Muhammad saw aur qiam aman
Aqibatul mukazibeen aul Afghanistan
Aqibatul mukazibeen hissa dom (Unpublished)
Yusu aur aasman
Yusu aur saleeb
Kia Yusu khuda tha
Kia Yusu khuda ka beta tha
Kia Yusu nabi tha
Kia Yusu bey  guna tha
Issayeat ki asliyyat part-1, part-2
Yusu aur tasleeth
Khliq u tuyyor
Aalim ul ghaib
Mohaye ul mouta
Kalimatullah
Rooho Allah
Roohul qudus
Isayon ke naam aik khat
Isa dare Kashmir
Khula khat banaam molvi Sana u llah
Fathe mubeen
Master Nizam u din ke naam challenge
Master Nizam u din ke naam dosara challenge
Khula khat banam molvi Muhammad Ali
Mir Mudasir Shah ka mazhab khilaf hazrat ahmas as
Mir Mudasir Shah ke do mazhab
Molvi Muhammad Ali ke do swalon ka jawab
Ishtiharat tardded ghair mubaieen dar bara toheen rasool
Ishtiharat tardeed molvi Kifayat Hussain shiah
Ishtiaar tardeed Anjuman Ishat Islam Peshawar
Qaati ul anf u shiah
Aqaid Ahmadiyya
Khwaja Kamal Din ke 5 swalon ka jawab
Mukhtasar Tareek Ahmadiyyat Sarhad

References

20th-century Afghan poets
Pashtun people
1883 births
1963 deaths
Pakistani Ahmadis
Pashtun writers
Male poets
20th-century male writers